is a district located in Kanagawa Prefecture, Japan.

As of 2009, the district has an estimated population of 32,333 and a density of 1,900 persons per km2.  The total area is 17.06 km2.

It currently consists of only one town, Hayama. The cities of Yokosuka, Zushi and Miura were formerly part of Miura District.

Towns and villages 
Hayama

History 

Miura District was one of the ancient subdivisions of Sagami Province, covering all of Miura Peninsula. It was under the control of the Miura clan from the late Heian period through the Sengoku period, and was held as tenryō territory administered by the shōgun under the Tokugawa shogunate of the Edo period. After the Meiji Restoration, it was established as a district under the cadastral reform of 1878, with a district office built near what is now Shioiri Station.

Timeline 
 On April 1, 1889, Miura District was divided into the following municipalities under the Meiji : 
 three towns (Yokosuka, Uraga and Misaki)
 12 villages (Toyoshima, Kinugasa, Urago, Kurihama, Nagai, Takeyama, Kitashitaura, Nakanishiura, Tagoe, Hayama, Minamishitaura and Hasse).
 On October 1, 1903, Toyoshima Village was promoted town status, but was absorbed into the town of Yokosuka on December 15, 1906 (which Yokosuka was promoted city status on February 15, 1907).
 On July 1, 1911, Nakanishiura Village was renamed as the village of Nishiura.
 On June 1, 1914, Urago Village was promoted town status and was renamed as the town of Taura.
 On April 1, 1924, Tagoe Village was promoted town status and was renamed as the town of Zushi.
 On January 1, 1925, Hayama Village was promoted town status.
 On February 2, 1925, Nagai Village was promoted town status.
 On February 15, 1933, Kinugasa Village was absorbed into the city of Yokosuka.
 On April 1, 1933, Taura Town was absorbed into the city of Yokosuka.
 On July 1, 1935, Nishiura Village was promoted town status and was renamed as the town of Okusu.
 On April 1, 1937, Kuriham Village was absorbed into the city of Yokosuka.
 On April 1, 1940, Minamishtaura Village was promoted town status.
 However, in 1943, Yokosuka expanded greatly by absorbing the towns of Uraga, Zushi, Nagai and Okusu and the two neighboring villages of Takeyama and Kitashitaura.
 On July 1, 1950, Zushi was separated from Yokosuka (becoming an independent municipality once again; which was promoted city status on July 1, 1954).
 On January 1, 1955, Minamishitaura Town, Misaki Town and Hasse Village merged to form the city of Miura.

As of 2009, this leaves only the town of Hayama as the sole remaining portion of Miura District.

Merger table 

Districts in Kanagawa Prefecture